The Horse is a noble animal or Absolutely Tame Is a Horse, (Persian: اسب حیوان نجیبی است; Asb Heivane Najibi Ast) is an Iranian film directed by Abdolreza Kahani. It is his fifth film and was made in the Persian year 1389 (Gregorian year 2010/2011).

Synopsis 
The story is about an escaped convict from prison leave for 24 hours and during this time trying his opinion, the exploits of a group of people brought toys.

Cast 
 Reza Attaran
 Habib Rezaei
 Parsa Pirouzfar
 Mahtab Keramati
 Karen Homayounfar
 Baran Kosari
 Mehran Ahmadi
 Mahaya Petrosian
 Babak Hamidian
 Pantea Bahram
 Ashkan Khatibi
 Ahmad Mehranfar
 Shahrad Radmehr

Factors 
 Script: Abdolreza Kahani
 Photography: Mohammadreza Sokout
 Editor: Shima Monfared
 Sound: Jahangir Mirshekari
 Designer makeup artist: Navid Frhmrzy
 Costume Designer: Farahnaz. Naderi
 Music: Karen Homayounfar
 Film Behind the scenes: Amir Azizi

Details 
 Genre: Black Comedy 
 Color
 Sound: stereo
 Location: Tehran

References 

 Monthly Movies, No. 419, in the twenty-eighth, Persian date Azar 1389

External links 
 

Iranian comedy films